Pool Hustler, known in Japan as , and in Europe as Pool Palace, is a video game developed by Ornith and published by ASK and Activision for PlayStation in 1998. A sequel to the game, entitled Q-Ball: Billiards Master, was released for PlayStation 2 in 2000.

Reception

The game received average reviews according to the review aggregation website GameRankings. In Japan, Famitsu gave it a score of 28 out of 40. GamePro said, "If you're going solo and [you] want to shoot straight pool, Pool Hustler will suit you nicely, but if you're looking for variety, Backstreet Billiards is the tops."

Notes

References

1998 video games
Activision games
Cue sports video games
PlayStation (console) games
PlayStation (console)-only games
Video games developed in Japan